Jon Avery Abrahams (born October 29, 1977) is an American actor. His most notable film roles include Bobby in Scary Movie (2000), Denny Byrnes in Meet the Parents (2000), and Dalton Chapman in the  House of Wax (2005).

Early life and family 
Abrahams was born in New York City. He attended Saint Ann's School in Brooklyn.

Abrahams' great-uncles were actor Mack Gray – long time confidant of entertainers George Raft, Dean Martin, and Frank Sinatra – and stuntman and fight coordinator Joe Gray. His father is the artist Martin Abrahams.

Career 
Abrahams made his film debut in Larry Clark's Kids.  His other feature credits include Scary Movie, Meet the Parents, My Boss's Daughter, Boiler Room, and House of Wax.

On television, Abrahams has appeared on Boston Public, Law & Order: Special Victims Unit, Second Generation Wayans,  The Mentalist, and Criminal Minds.  He was also "DJ Jonny" on The Ellen DeGeneres Show for season four.

In 2013, Abrahams was cast as the lead in the indie movie Room 105. In 2014, Abrahams was cast in We Are Your Friends as a club promoter.

In 2016, Abrahams made his directorial debut with the film All at Once. The film was released on DVD and video-on-demand in 2018. In 2017, Abrahams was cast in the crime drama film Clover, which he also directed. In 2022 he released his third directorial effort with the gay slasher thriller Exploited.

Filmography

Film

Television

Music videos

References

External links 

1977 births
Living people
American male film actors
American male television actors
Male actors from New York City
20th-century American male actors
21st-century American male actors
Saint Ann's School (Brooklyn) alumni